During the 2004–05 season, Middlesbrough participated in the FA Premier League.

Final league table

Kit
During this season, Middlesbrough had a new sponsor, 888.com. The team's kit was produced by Errea. The home shirt included a white band on it for the first time since the 2000–01 season. The away strip was mainly white with maroon sleeves, navy blue shorts and white socks.  Away to Southampton, white shorts and navy socks were worn with the away shirt.

Season review
After the triumph in the League Cup final the previous season and a solid 11th-place finish in the league, Boro fans were optimistic that this season would be a success. Steve McClaren signed Boudewijn Zenden and Doriva on permanent deals following their loan spells, as well as adding high-profile signings Ray Parlour, Mark Viduka, Jimmy Floyd Hasselbaink and Michael Reiziger to the squad. With these new additions, the supporters felt that, come the end of the season, Boro would be pushing for a league place good enough to qualify for Europe.

The season started well and Middlesbrough found themselves in fourth position following only one loss in the first 5 games. Despite a slight drop in their form, Boro kept in and around the top four until mid-November.

However, the UEFA Cup took its toll on the small Boro squad and their form stuttered towards Christmas. The team seemed to consist of more and more young players who were deputising for more senior players such as Gaizka Mendieta and Malcolm Christie who were ruled out for the season with injuries.

Following a 2–0 win at home to Norwich City on 28 December, Boro were in fifth place. However, not helped by an injury to George Boateng, after only one win in the next ten games the team found themselves in ninth and seemed to have undone their good work at the start of the season.

Things did finally pick up and, following only three losses in the final 12 games of the season, they found themselves up against Manchester City in the final game of the season. Both teams were in direct contest for the seventh place that Boro occupied, and a win for either side would mean qualification for the UEFA Cup. A last-minute penalty save by Mark Schwarzer gave Boro a 1–1 draw and the all important seventh-placed finish. For the first time in their history, Middlesbrough had qualified for Europe through the league.

The season was full of highs and lows for the Boro fans. The disappointment of losing their early strong position due to the injury crisis was offset against the emergence of several promising youngsters such as Stewart Downing, James Morrison and Anthony McMahon.

Both domestic cups were disappointing for the Boro team and the draws weren't favourable towards them. They only lasted two rounds in each competition, going out in the fourth round of both cups, to Manchester United in the FA Cup and to a young Liverpool side in the League Cup. The UEFA Cup run - Middlesbrough's first foray into Europe, having won the first major trophy of their history, the League Cup, the previous season - held greater joy. The first round was a two-legged knockout match against Baník Ostrava - Boro's first ever European match, with the first leg was at home. With a fantastic atmosphere at the Riverside, Middlesbrough cruised through the first leg 3–0; with a comfortable 1–1 draw in the away leg, they had qualified for the group stages and were guaranteed another 4 matches.

Middlesbrough were drawn in Group D, along with Villarreal, Lazio, Egaleo and Partizan Belgrade. The fans were confident that the team could earn at least a third-place finish in the group and therefore qualify for the knockout stages.

Boro went on to exceed all expectations, beating Egalio and Partizan Belgrade as expected and also achieving a fantastic 2–0 victory over Lazio - the only blot being a 2–0 away loss to Villarreal. This was enough to earn them a second-place finish and qualification for the next round, where Middlesbrough were drawn against Grazer AK. Middlesbrough managed a 2–2 draw against the then Austrian champions in the first leg, away. The team duly built on this in the return leg and progressed to the next round following a 2–1 win.

The round of 16 saw Boro face Sporting Lisbon for a place in the quarter finals. However, luck wasn't with Middlesbrough and they found themselves in the middle of an injury crisis. The first leg was at home and remained goalless at half time. Sporting then proceed to show their class and scored 3 in a thirty-minute spell after the break. Boro looked like they were to exit the competition, but a spectacular overhead scissor kick from Joseph Desire-Job and a late Chris Riggott goal gave a weakened Boro team a fairly respectable 3–2 loss. The second leg didn't go to plan though; despite fantastic support from 3,000 travelling fans, Middlesbrough went down 1–0, losing 4–2 on aggregate. The Boro fans took the defeat in good heart, however, and partied late into the night in Lisbon.

Middlesbrough's UEFA Cup run was seen as a huge success by the fans, and expectations were high for the following year's campaign.

First-team squad
The following are all the players who were involved the Middlesbrough F.C. first team at some point during the 2004-05 season.

Transfers

In

Out

Results

Premier League

Results per matchday

Note: Results are given with Middlesbrough score listed first. Man of the Match is according to mfc.co.uk.

League Cup

FA Cup

UEFA Cup

Player statistics

Goalscorers
Goalscoring statistics for 2004-05.

Appearances and discipline
Appearance and disciplinary records for 2004-05 league and cup matches.

References and notes

Middlesbrough F.C. seasons
Middles